Double Lake is a pair of lakes in Cottonwood County, in the U.S. state of Minnesota.

Double Lake was named from the fact these twin lakes are separated only by a narrow passage.

References

Lakes of Minnesota
Lakes of Cottonwood County, Minnesota